The Centre of Indian Communists (CIC) was a minor Maoist group in the Indian state of Kerala. The organisation was founded at a convention in Ernakulam in 1974. It included elements that had broken away from Communist Party of India (Marxist) (CPI(M)).

Kerala, Vanguardism, and the CIC

Kerala, an Introduction
The Center of Indian Communist (CIC) did not gain popularity within a vacuum, their platform manifested within the context of the greater population of Kerala, a district known for employing leftist values in their political decisions.  In the elections of 1957, the people of Kerala gave the Communist Party of India thirty-five present of the vote, demonstrating strong communist values among the people.

Vanguardism in Kerala and the CPI
The Center of Indian Communist (CIC) distanced themselves from the Communist Party of India (CPI) largely because they saw the peasantry as being the appropriate vehicle for revolution as opposed to the proletariat. This contrast is analogous to that of Maoism and Marxism, Mao focuses his literature on the peasantry while Marx stresses the importance of the proletariat.   While both Revolutionary Vanguards utilize the ethos of class struggle as their main rhetorical strategy, the areas where they depart are consequential. The proletariat encompasses all of the working class, while the peasant is one who is under direct control of an individual, thus accentuating the dominance hierarchy on an interpersonal level.  Naturally, a multi-varied equation would be necessary to plot the requisite conditions from which communist sympathies emerge, however, some political-scientist attribute communist acceptance in Kerala as being the result of a high population of agricultural workers and peasants.  This analysis is important when examining the Center of Indian Communist in contrast to the Communist Party of India.

Demographic Kinship between Kerala and Mao's China
The Center of Indian Communist (CIC) saw their propagation strategy as superior given the prominence of agricultural peasantry within the Keralan people. The (CIC) was a Maoist organization, one which developed under similar demographic conditions to that of Mao’s China. Maoism seemed like the perfect fit for the (CIC) because of the strong emphasis on what Mao described as the “declassed intellectual elite” as the appropriate mechanism for revolution. Similar to Mao's description of China, the vast majority of the people in Kerala were very well educated, they enjoyed some of the highest literacy rates in all of India.  Despite this, they also suffered from unemployment, and high levels of poverty.  As a result of the demographic Kinship shared with pre-revolutionary China, the Center of Indian Communist aimed to propagate a revolutionary Maoist political ideology to the people of Kerala.

A Struggle for Traction: How Marxist Ideology Became the Primary Mediator of Revolutionary Discourse in India

Fundamentals of Marxism
In his work, Karl Marx was deliberate in establishing the requisite industrial conditions under which his theory becomes applicable.  These conditions included a normative class structure predicated on achievement, such as capitalism.  It also necessitated a high level of career mobility, a precursor for industrial development.  Marx cites that Western industrialized society often sees and increases in demand for a product without increasing production, thus leading to price inflation instead of industrial development. Under this model goods become the tools of ostentation, the possession of land, technology, and even food become emblematic of economic achievement.  Marx argues that this system is only able to prevail under the lie of autonomy, an equation in which the only variable relative to fiscal success is the conscientiousness of the individual. For Marx, a communist revolution of the people can only be achieved when the proletariat actualize the erroneous nature of this analysis, allowing the poor and middle class majority to rise up against the rich and powerful minority. This model of revolution is widely applicable given the prominence of industrial workers throughout the world, and particularly within India.

British Imperialism, the Proletariat, and Massive Competition
The broad appeal of Marxism in large part could explain why the Center of Indian Communist (CIC) were never able to create a substantial impact on a national scale. Their Maoist appeal to the peasantry and agricultural laborers was not as broad as the Marxist proletariat within the greater context of India. Ashutosh Kumar cites British imperialism as being formative in the development of the Indian proletariat, potently serving as a catalyst for the uprising of Marxist political ideology throughout the country. The British government obliged India to start producing goods for import such as cotton, wool, hemp, and indigo.  The strong and conscious proletariat left by the ashes of British imperialism almost universally lent support to the Communist Party of India (Marxist) (CPI(M)). As a result of their prominence on the national scale the (CPI(M)) was able to reach their influence to practically every corner of India including Kerala.  Given the demographic framework of Kerala juxtaposed with the Communist Center of India’s peasant tailored rhetoric, one could assume their local influence would be vast, however, British rule left India with a massive industrial proletariat, one that eventually precipitated the ideological dominance enjoyed by the Communist Party of India (Marxist).

Emergency in India, and the Downfall of the Center of Indian Communist

Indira Gandhi and Fakhruddin Ali Ahmed
The Center of Indian Communist (CIC) was able to exist peacefully up until what is now known as The Emergency took place in 1975. Indira Gandhi was the prime minister of India at the time, she recommended that president Fakhruddin Ali Ahmed declare a state of emergency caused by fear of growing communist sentiments. This effectively halted the democracy, suspending elections and imprisoning much of Ahmed’s political opposition. Emergency rule also meant that any authority as high as the District Magistrate could detain any individual that they suspect as being hostile to the Indian government.  The proclamation of emergency also entailed widespread censorship of Indian news outlets and entertainment.  During this period in India there was virtually no standard for individual freedoms from the government, not only would executive powers have free rein over the fate of the democracy, the public were not allowed to challenge their decisions in court.

Article 352
Gandhi and Ahmed were able to change India’s political landscape within their legal bounds as a result of Article 352 of the Constitution of India. This article describes the process by with an emergency of national security is declared, a proclamation of emergency is to be used in order to protect Indian rule throughout their territory.

Backlash
Gandhi and Ahmed claimed that the emergence of various resistance movements across India were indicative of a threat to national security and eventually used article 352 as a means to eradicate dissenting thought. However, many scholars argue that this was not a matter of national security, rather they cite high oil prices and deteriorating living conditions under Ahmed’s administration as being formative in changing India’s political landscape.  Naturally Ahmed grew fearful that he would lose his control over India, both Gandhi and Ahmed agreed that it would be beneficial to ban his political opponents, leaving himself as the only legal option for support. Indira Gandhi and Fakhruddin Ali Ahmed soured their reputation with much of the public considerably.  On October 31, 1984 Indira Gandhi was assassinated by her own security team, afterward, her son Rajiv Gandhi took over her position as prime minister.  These events came to pass well after the conclusion of the emergency in India, however, they demonstrate the level of political instability from which the Communist Center of India emerged, eventually culminating in the assassination of their prime minister.

The Downfall of the CIC
Despite their best efforts to halt the spread of Communism across India, the very early stages of the emergency saw many resistance groups gain popularity as a result of growing fears surrounding the future of Indian democracy.  However, this growth was extremely short, Ahmed introduced the prohibition of several individual resistance groups throughout India, one of which was the CIC. While this marked the end of the Center of Indian Communist it certainly did not stop the prominence of revolutionary discourse within the people of Kerala and the rest of India. The Center of Indian Communist and other analogous resistance groups are emblematic of the widespread inequality and government corruption that plagued India during the 70s.

References

Defunct communist parties in India
Defunct Maoist organisations in India
Banned communist parties
Political parties established in 1974
1974 establishments in India
Political parties disestablished in 1977
1977 disestablishments in India
Organisations designated as terrorist by India